The 2017 FIBA 3x3 Europe Cup was the third edition of the 3x3 Europe Championships, organized by FIBA Europe, and was held between 7 and 9 July 2017, at the Museumplein in Amsterdam, the Netherlands. This 3x3 basketball competition featured separate tournaments for men's and women's national teams.

Latvia won their first European championship title in the men's tournament, by beating Slovenia in the final. In the women's tournament, Russia won their second European championship title by beating Spain in the final.

Qualification

The qualification events took place in June 2017. Twenty-four teams from 16 countries took part in these tournaments, with 12 teams of each gender qualifying for the final championship.

Men

Women

Participating teams
The FIBA 3x3 Federation Ranking was used as basis to determine the participating FIBA member associations. Pools were announced on 26 June 2017.

Men

Women

Medalists

See also
 2017 FIBA 3x3 Under-18 Europe Cup
 2017 FIBA 3x3 World Cup

References

External links
Official website

 
2017
2017 in 3x3 basketball
2017 in Dutch sport
FIBA 3x3 Europe Cup, 2017
International basketball competitions hosted by the Netherlands
July 2017 sports events in Europe